The gare d'Avignon-Centre (Avignon Central railway station) is a railway station serving the city of Avignon, in Vaucluse, France. It is on the Paris–Marseille railway.

Description 
The station building was constructed in 1866 according to the plans of the architect Louis-Jules Bouchot, and is similar to its counterpart at Valence-Ville, which was also designed by Bouchot. The building's symmetrical façade is neoclassical in style, with five bays and a clock surmounting the balustrade.

Train traffic 
A wide range of trains use Avignon-Centre station, including Transport express régional, TGV trains from Paris Gare de Lyon, Provence, Côte d'Azur and Languedoc. Many other TGV trains stop at the Avignon TGV station.

The services include:
local service (TER Occitanie) Narbonne - Béziers - Montpellier - Nîmes - Avignon
express service (TER Occitanie) Cerbère - Perpignan - Narbonne - Montpellier - Nîmes - Avignon
local service (TER Auvergne-Rhône-Alpes) Lyon - Valence - Avignon
express service (TER Provence-Alpes-Côte d'Azur) Lyon - Valence - Avignon - Marseille
local service (TER Provence-Alpes-Côte d'Azur) Avignon - Cavaillon - Miramas - Marseille
local service (TER Provence-Alpes-Côte d'Azur) Avignon - Carpentras
local service (TER Provence-Alpes-Côte d'Azur) Avignon - Arles - Miramas - Marseille

References

External links 
 Site officiel SNCF/TER PACA

Buildings and structures in Avignon
Railway stations in France opened in 1860
Railway stations in Vaucluse